Federico Faruffini (1833–1869) was an Italian painter and engraver of historical subjects, in a style that combines the styles and themes of Realism with the diffuse outlines and lively colors of Scapigliatura painters.

Biography
Born in Sesto, a commune now inside the metropolitan area of Milan, he initially trained with Trecourt in Pavia. He befriended Tranquillo Cremona and accompanied him to Milan and Venice. He traveled with Giovanni Carnovali. In the 1864 exposition at the Brera, he submitted a watercolor, Coro della Certosa di Pavia, and four oil canvases: Scholars of Alciato, an Annunciation, Sordello e Cunizza, and his Machiavelli and Borgia, which he both painted and engraved, and for which he received a medal in 1866. His Sacrifice at the Nile was painted for the 1865 exhibition. In 1867, at the Paris Salon, he was awarded a first prize medal for a paintings of Borgia and one of The death of Ernesto Cairoli.

Lack of recognition and financial difficulties is said to have led him to his suicide at age 38, in Perugia.

Gallery

Notes

References

Attribution:
 

1831 births
1869 deaths
19th-century Italian painters
19th-century Italian male artists
Italian male painters
People from Sesto San Giovanni
Neo-Pompeian painters
1860s suicides